Leslie Alan Carter (born 24 October 1960) is an English former professional footballer who played in the Football League as a forward. He began his youth career at Crystal Palace and was part of the team that won the FA Youth Cup in 1978. He signed professional terms in November 1977, but did not make his senior debut until January 1981. He made one further appearance that season as a substitute and in February 1982, moved on to Bristol City. After only 16 appearances for Bristol City Carter moved on to Australia where he played for Adelaide City.

References

External links

1960 births
Living people
Footballers from Farnborough, London
English footballers
Association football forwards
Crystal Palace F.C. players
Bristol City F.C. players
Adelaide City FC players
Caroline Springs George Cross FC players
English Football League players